Big Brother 2020, also known as BB2020, is the fifth season of the Portuguese version of the reality show Big Brother. It's the first time the original format of Big Brother to air since the Portuguese version of Secret Story, and the first time after seventeen years, the regular version to air since the fourth season in 2003. BB2020 was announced on  30 November 2019 by TVI, as a celebration for the twentieth anniversary of Big Brother.

Former Big Brother Famosos 2 housemate Cláudio Ramos host the main Gala show on Sundays. Model and radio host Mafalda de Castro host the afternoon daily show "BB MAG/Diario" and the afternoon extra show "Extra Tarde". Maria Botelho Moniz host the midnight extra show "BB - Fora d'Horas/Extra".

The show was originally scheduled to start on 22 March 2020. But was postponed until further notice by TVI due to the impact of COVID-19 pandemic in Portugal.

On 18 April 2020, it was revealed that the show will start on 26 April 2020. Later revealed that the first two weeks of the show would be a special edition, named BB ZOOM.

Big Brother officially started on 10 May 2020. Seventeen housemates from BB ZOOM entered the Big Brother house. In addition, two new housemates entered quarantine.

BB ZOOM

The first two weeks would be known as BB ZOOM - A Caminho da Casa for a special edition before the BB2020 starts. The housemates did not enter the Big Brother house at the beginning of the season, instead, they entered the specific apartment guarded by several cameras individually. During the time, housemates can communicate with the other housemates via videoconference and they would face some challenges. At the end of each week, the housemates would be evaluated by viewers, and fight for the title of "Favorite of the Public". During this period, all housemates would participate diagnostic tests for COVID-19 twice, after two weeks in the apartment, all housemates who test negative of COVID-19 would officially enter the Big Brother house. One of the eighteen housemates would be evicted from the show.

Housemates

Twist

Housemate ratings
During the first week of BB ZOOM, every housemate and the public on the official Big Brother app evaluate their fellow housemates from 1 to 5 stars during the week. At the end of the week, the housemate that gets the best-combined score wins the title of Leader and gets immunity from the first nomination. In a case of a tie, the public ratings have prevalence.
 - Top of housemates rating
 - Top of public rating
 - Head of Household

Repechage
During the eviction show on Day 64, it was revealed that two ex-housemates would return to the house on the following eviction show on Day 71. However, they would not compete for the main prize. A vote to return was opened on the official app and every Evicted housemate until Week 8 was eligible to return (Angélica, Daniel Monteiro, Edmar, Fábio, Hélder, Jéssica, Renato, Rui and Slávia), meaning only Pedro Soá (Ejected), Sónia (Walked) and Daniel Guerreiro (Evictee of Week 9) could not return. On Day 71 it was revealed the ex-housemates that were selected would not return as official housemates competing for the main prize, but for a different prize between them in which they would face off in several challenges, and the winner between them would win a trip to Madeira.

On the finale night, it was revealed that Daniel Monteiro succeeded the most challenges and won the trip.

Nominations table

Note
:  On Day 7, it was revealed on BB MAG that Sónia was the Leader and she was immune for the first nomination. The housemates didn't know this, so they still could nominate her. At the end of the nominations, she can swap one of the nominees for one of her choice. If she is among the ones with the most votes, she has to use this power. Fábio, Pedro Soá and Sónia were the original nominees. As the Leader, Sónia replaced herself with Diogo.
: After two weeks of quarantine, housemates were finally able to enter the house. However, one of them will have a shortcut and be evicted before this stage. Therefore, only 17 housemates will enter the house.
:  As the two housemates saved from the previous eviction, Diogo and Pedro Soá became the first Leaders of Big Brother. They decided who would nominate in the Diary Room or face-to-face.
:  As punishment for Hélder used inappropriate homophobic language, the public will decide whether he should be ejected or not.
:  As a new housemate, Teresa decided who would be nominated on the Diary Room and face-to-face, as well as choosing one housemate to be banned from nominating. She chose Sónia.
: The public voted on the official app on their favorites. The housemates with the most votes would win privileges, one winning immunity and the other having the power to save one of the nominees. Diogo was chosen as the favorite and the public gave him immunity, however, he would only win it if he accepted a dilemma proposed by Big Brother and he denied it. Iury was the second most voted and gained the power to save one of the original nominees. She accepted the dilemma and saved Hélder.
:  As punishment for Sónia broke the house rules by communicated the outside world, the public will decide whether she should be ejected or not.
:  Pedro Soá was ejected for violent behavior.
: As punishment for Teresa broke the house rules by communicated the outside world. If she is saved by the public vote she would not be able to take part in the Leader contest and would not receive immunity since she is already nominated.
:   During the eviction show, there were draws were the first housemate to pick the gold ball would have to choose if they wanted to open a box with a twist. Slávia picked the first gold ball, and from her box she got immunity. Soraia got the next gold ball and got an automatic nomination from her box.
: As Leader, Daniel Monteiro had to choose 2 housemates which nominations would be voided. As they didn't know, they still nominated normally, but their nominations didn't count.
: As the last nominee saved, Teresa got the last box, which had the power to save one of the nominees. She chose to save herself.
:   This week only females could be nominated, giving males immunity. As Ana refused to nominated other women, she was automatically nominated.
: As the Leader, Angélica had the power to save one of the nominees. She chose to save Teresa.
:  Diogo won immunity on a challenge between the males.
: Housemates nominated in pairs in the Diary Room and their nominations would count as one. The first two nominations were given by a single housemate, and the third one would have to be agreed (in bold). The pairs were:  Pedro Alves & Diogo,  Angélica & Soraia,  Sandrina & Daniel Guerreiro,  Jéssica & Iury,  Daniel Monteiro & Noélia and  Sónia & Ana. As Leader,  Teresa nominated alone.
:  The public voted during the eviction show for who they wanted to be nominated from the housemates that had never faced the public vote (Angélica, Iury, Jéssica, Pedro Alves and Sandrina). Pedro Alves (36%) and Angélica (33%) received the most votes and they were automatically nominated.
:  Sandrina was automatically nominated because she received a message from her family and the outside world.
:  The public voted again during the eviction show for who they wanted to be nominated. Pedro Alves (36%) and Jéssica (24%) received the most voted and they were automatically nominated.
:  As punishment for her violent behaviour towards other housemates and xenophobic comments, Sónia was removed from her title of Leader on Week 7 and was automatically nominated for Week 8. As she ended up quitting the game, this punishment had no effect.
:   In a draw, 3 housemates won the power to give to other housemates. Soraia won the power to give immunity and gave it to Ana. Teresa won the power to give a double vote and gave it to Daniel Monteiro. As Daniel Monteiro was evicted, Teresa gave the double vote to Iury. Finally, Daniel Guerreiro won the power to give an automatic nomination and gave it to Noélia.
:   Jéssica and Noélia went to the decision room and had to give someone immunity and someone a prize amount of €500 and a trip for two. They gave immunity to Pedro Alves and the trip to Ana. After this, the housemates given the rewards had to choose the closest housemate to them to receive a consequence. Pedro Alves chose Daniel Guerreiro and he received an automatic nomination, while Ana chose Diogo and he could not participate in the next Leader competition. As Pedro Alves eventually won the HoH competition, he had to give his extra immunity to someone else. He gave it to Sandrina.
: This week housemates could nominate only one of their fellow housemates, except the Leader Pedro Alves who nominated 3 housemates as usual.
: Noélia and Teresa received the most nominations and were up for eviction. However, there was a tie between Ana, Iury, Pedro Alves and Soraia with 2 nominations. As Leader, Diogo had the power to save two housemates on the tie. He chose to save Ana and Soraia, therefore Iury and Pedro Alves are nominated as well.
:  During the eviction show on Day 64, it was revealed that two previous evicted housemates would return to the house on the following eviction show on Day 71. However, they would not compete for the main prize. Two housemates returned to the house were Daniel Monteiro and Hélder. See Repechage.
:  On Day 71, 3 passports to the final were given. In the first one, the housemates voted for who they thought was the best player. Sandrina received the most votes with 3 and received the first passport. The second passport was the Leader competition. Diogo won it and won the second passport. Then the housemates nominated, and as Soraia received the least nominations she received the third passport. The rest of the housemates were nominated for the last eviction.
: The public is now voting for who they want to win.

Nominations total received
Q. - indicate this housemate was in quarantine before entered the Big Brother house.

References

External links
  

2020 Portuguese television seasons
Big Brother (Portuguese TV series)
Television productions suspended due to the COVID-19 pandemic